Phil DeGaetano (born 9 August 1963) is an Italian ice hockey player. He competed in the men's tournament at the 1994 Winter Olympics.

References

External links
 

1963 births
Living people
Olympic ice hockey players of Italy
Ice hockey players at the 1994 Winter Olympics
Sportspeople from New York City
Ice hockey players from New York (state)
Northern Michigan Wildcats men's ice hockey players
Indianapolis Checkers players
Adirondack Red Wings players
Maine Mariners players
Peoria Rivermen (IHL) players
New Jersey Rockin' Rollers players